i is a passenger railway station operated by the Takamatsu-Kotohira Electric Railroad in Takamatsu, Kagawa, Japan.  It is operated by the private transportation company Takamatsu-Kotohira Electric Railroad (Kotoden) and is designated station "K06".

Lines
Busshōzan Station is a station on the Kotoden Kotohira Line and is located 8.0 km from the opposing terminus of the line at Takamatsu-Chikkō Station.

Layout
The station consists of a side platform and an island platform serving three tracks. The platforms are connected by level crossings. Track 3 on the island platform is short and can handle trains with a length of only two carriages, and it is dead headed.

Adjacent stations

History
Busshōzan Station opened on December 21, 1926 as a station of the Kotohira Electric Railway. On November 1, 1943 it became  a station on the Takamatsu Kotohira Electric Railway Kotohira Line due to a company merger. In April 1987, the station building was relocated 336 meters in the direction of Kotoden Kotohira.

Surrounding area
The city of Takamatsu operates a park and ride lot near the station.
Kagawa Prefectural Road No. 12 Miki Kokubunji Line
Takamatsu Kotohira Electric Railway Busshozan Factory
Takamatsu Municipal Ryuun Junior High School

Passenger statistics

See also
 List of railway stations in Japan

References

External links

  

Railway stations in Japan opened in 1926
Railway stations in Takamatsu